A partial solar eclipse occurred on Tuesday, September 2, 1997. A solar eclipse occurs when the Moon passes between Earth and the Sun, thereby totally or partly obscuring the image of the Sun for a viewer on Earth. A partial solar eclipse occurs in the polar regions of the Earth when the center of the Moon's shadow misses the Earth.

Images

Related eclipses

Eclipses of 1997 
 A total solar eclipse on March 9.
 A partial lunar eclipse on March 24.
 A partial solar eclipse on September 2.
 A total lunar eclipse on September 16.

Solar eclipses 1997–2000

Metonic series

References

External links 
 NASA graphics

Photos:
  APOD 9/3/1997, A Partial Eclipse in Southern Skies, partial eclipse from Kingscote, Kangaroo Island, South Australia

1997 9 2
1997 in science
1997 9 2
September 1997 events